Claudio José Casas Gallego (born 26 February 1982 in Teruel) is a Spanish former professional road racing cyclist. He is the guitarist for the Spanish alternative metal band Dark Noise.

References

1982 births
Living people
Spanish male cyclists
People from Teruel
Sportspeople from the Province of Teruel
Cyclists from Aragon